In 3D computer graphics, a Doo–Sabin subdivision surface is a type of subdivision surface based on a generalization of bi-quadratic uniform B-splines, whereas Catmull-Clark was based on generalized bi-cubic uniform B-splines. The subdivision refinement algorithm was developed in 1978 by Daniel Doo and Malcolm Sabin.

The Doo-Sabin process generates one new face at each original vertex,  new faces along each original edge, and  new faces at each original face. A primary characteristic of the Doo–Sabin subdivision method is the creation of four faces and four edges (valence 4) around every new vertex in the refined mesh. A drawback is that the faces created at the original vertices  may be triangles or n-gons that are not necessarily coplanar.

Evaluation 
Doo–Sabin surfaces are defined recursively. Like all subdivision procedures, each refinement iteration, following the procedure given, replaces the current mesh with a "smoother", more refined mesh. After many iterations, the surface will gradually converge onto a smooth limit surface.

Just as for Catmull–Clark surfaces, Doo–Sabin limit surfaces can also be evaluated directly without any recursive refinement, by means of the technique of Jos Stam. The solution is, however, not as computationally efficient as for Catmull–Clark surfaces because the Doo–Sabin subdivision matrices are not (in general) diagonalizable.

See also 
 Expansion (equivalent geometric operation) - facets are moved apart after being separated, and new facets are formed
 Conway polyhedron notation - a set of related topological polyhedron and polygonal mesh operators
Catmull-Clark subdivision surface
Loop subdivision surface

External links 

 Doo–Sabin surfaces

3D computer graphics
Multivariate interpolation